Clark Reid Martell (born December 23, 1959) is an American white supremacist and the former leader of Chicago Area SkinHeads (CASH), which was founded in 1985 by six skinheads under his leadership. This was the first organized neo-Nazi white power skinhead group in the United States. The group was also called Romantic Violence, and was the first US distributor of records and tapes from the English band Skrewdriver.

In June 1989, Martell was sentenced to 11 years in prison for beating up a 20-year-old woman who quit a neo-Nazi group and allegedly had black friends. He drew a swastika on the wall using her blood. While in prison, he appeared in an episode of Oprah via phone connection, stating his views on white nationalism.

References

Further reading
Jack B. Moore, "Skinheads Shaved for Battle" – p. 75
Mark S. Hamm, "American skinheads: the criminology and control of hate crime" – p. 5
Stephen E. Atkins, "Encyclopedia of Modern American Extremists and Extremist Groups" – p. 13
Karen L. Kinnear, "Gangs: a reference handbook" – p. 51
Elinor Langer, "A Hundred Little Hitlers" – p. 187
Kathy Marks, Adolfo Caso, "Faces of right wing extremism" – p. 73.
Betty A. Dobratz, Lisa K. Waldner, Tim Buzzell, "The politics of social inequality" – p. 135
Herbert C. Covey, Scott W. Menard, Robert J. Franzese, "Juvenile gangs" – p. 64
Betty A. Dobratz, Stephanie L. Shanks-Meile, "White power, white pride!: the white separatist movement in the United States" – p. 208, 228
Sean Anderson, Stephen Sloan, "Historical dictionary of terrorism" – p. 460
Louis Kontos, David Brotherton, "Encyclopedia of gangs" – p. 218
Warren Kinsella, "Web of Hate: Inside Canada's Far Right Network" – p. 260
Martin Durham, "White Rage: The Extreme Right and American Politics" – p. 31
Kathleen M. Blee, "Inside Organized Racism: Women in the Hate Movement" – p. 235

External links 
Bishop, Katherine (June 13, 1988). "Neo-Nazi Activity Is Arising Among U.S. Youth". New York Times.
SPLCenter.org: Ten Who Terrify
Leo, John (January 25, 1988). "Behavior: A Chilling Wave of Racism". Time.

1960 births
Living people
People from Billings, Montana
American neo-Nazis